"Sensuality" is a song by British group Lovestation, released as a single in 1998. The song peaked at No. 16 in the UK, giving the group their second top 20 hit, after "Teardrops" (No. 14). It appears on their debut album Soulsation, released in 2000.

Track listing
UK 12"
A1. "Sensuality" (Classic 12" Mix) - 6:03
A2. "Sensuality" (Lovestation Future Funk Mix)	- 6:15
B1. "Sensuality" (Industry Standard Mix) - 5:41
B2. "Teardrops" (Curtis and Moore Remix) - 6:35

UK CD maxi-single
 "Sensuality" (Lovestation Classic 7" Mix) - 3:46
 "Sensuality" (Lovestation Future Funk Mix) - 6:24
 "Teardrops" (Curtis and Moore Remix) - 6:36

Charts

References

1998 songs
1998 singles
Lovestation songs